Esio Trot is a children's novel written by British author Roald Dahl and illustrated by Quentin Blake. Published on 3 September 1990, it was the last of Dahl's books to be published in his lifetime; he died just two months later.

Unlike other Dahl works (which often feature tyrannical adults and heroic/magical children), Esio Trot is the story of an ageing, lonely man (Mr Hoppy), trying to make a connection with a person that he has loved from afar (his widowed neighbour, Mrs Silver).

In 1994, Monty Python star Michael Palin provided the English language audiobook recording of the book. In 2015 it was adapted by Richard Curtis into a BBC television film, Roald Dahl's Esio Trot, featuring Dustin Hoffman and Judi Dench as the couple, with James Corden narrating.

Story
Mr Hoppy is a shy elderly man who lives alone in an apartment, tending to his many plants, which have been the center of his life since he retired from his job in a bus garage several years before. For many years, he has had a secret love whose name was Mrs Silver. She lives in the flat below his, and he frequently leans over his balcony and exchanges polite conversations with Mrs Silver, but his courage fails him whenever he prepares to hint at his true feelings for her.

Mrs Silver has a small pet tortoise, Alfie, who is the centre of her world. One morning, Mrs Silver mentions to Mr Hoppy that even though she has owned Alfie for many years, he has only grown a tiny bit and has gained only 13 ounces in weight. She confesses that she wishes she knew of some way to make her little Alfie grow into a larger, more dignified tortoise. Mr Hoppy suddenly thinks of a way to give Mrs Silver her wish and win her heart.

Mr Hoppy tells Mrs Silver that he — in fact — knows a way to make a tortoise grow bigger. He writes the following words on a slip of paper, and lowers it down to Mrs Silver:

ESIO TROT, ESIO TROT,
TEG REGGIB REGGIB,
EMOC NO, ESIO TROT,
WORG PU, FFUP PU, TOOHS PU,
GNIRPS PU, WOLB PU, LLEWS PU!
EGROG! ELZZUG! FFUTS! PLUG!
TUP NO TAF, ESIO TROT, TUP NO TAF,
OG NO, OG NO, ELBBOG DOOF.

Mr Hoppy explains that these magic words, when whispered in Alfie's ear three times a day, will cause Alfie to grow bigger and bigger. Mrs Silver is doubtful, but agrees to try. (The words are, reversed, Tortoise, tortoise, get bigger bigger! Come on, tortoise, grow up, puff up, shoot up! Spring up, blow up, swell up! Gorge! Guzzle! Stuff! Gulp! Put on fat, tortoise, put on fat! Go on, go on, gobble food!)

Over the next few days, Mr Hoppy carries out the second part of his plan. He visits every pet shop in the city, and buys many tortoises of various sizes, but none that weigh less than 13 ounces. Mr Hoppy brings all the tortoises back to his flat and installs them in a makeshift corral in his living room. Next, Mr Hoppy builds a special tool to help him snatch the tortoise from Mrs Silver's balcony. He fastens a handle to the end of a long metal tube, and a tiny claw at the bottom. By pulling the handle, the arms of the claw gently open and close.

The following day, when Mrs Silver leaves for work, Mr Hoppy selects a tortoise from his living room that weighs exactly 15 ounces. He carefully picks Alfie up from the lower balcony, and exchanges him with the new tortoise. When Mrs Silver returns home, she faithfully whispers the magic words in Alfie's ear, but does not notice that an exchange has been made.

Over the next 8 weeks, Mr Hoppy continues to switch Mrs Silver's current pet with a slightly larger tortoise, but she still does not perceive that her pet is growing in size. One afternoon, Mrs Silver comments to Mr Hoppy that Alfie seems a bit bigger, but can not tell for sure. Suddenly, Mrs Silver notices that Alfie can no longer fit through the door to his house, and exclaims to Mr Hoppy that his spell is sure to be working. Mrs Silver runs inside and weighs her pet, and is surprised to find that Alfie now weighs 27 ounces, more than double the weight he was before. Mr Hoppy summons his courage and asks Mrs Silver if he can come down and see the effect for himself. Mrs Silver, in raptures over her pet's transformation, gladly grants his request.

Mr Hoppy runs down the stairs, nervous and excited to be on the brink of winning Mrs Silver's love. Mrs Silver flings open the door, embraces Mr Hoppy, and expresses her admiration for Mr Hoppy's magical spell.  However, the tortoise cannot fit in the house now, so Mr Hoppy tells Mrs Silver to say the magic spell in reverse (Tortoise, tortoise, get bigger bigger, etc.). On the next night he secretly replaces this tortoise with one slightly smaller one. His part works splendidly, and Mr Hoppy, suddenly emboldened by Mrs Silver's warm smile, asks Mrs Silver for her hand in marriage. Mrs Silver delightedly accepts Mr Hoppy's proposal, then adds that she thought he would never get around to asking. "All due to Alfie!" she cries.

Mr Hoppy secretly returns all the tortoises in his living room back to their respective pet shops, telling all the owners that no refund is needed. Mr Hoppy and Mrs Silver are happily married a few weeks later. The "original" Alfie is bought by a girl called Roberta Squibb after he is returned to a pet shop; moreover, after many years, he does indeed grow to double his size before.

Adaptation
The book was adapted by Richard Curtis and Paul Mayhew-Archer (the team that had previously written The Vicar of Dibley) into a BBC comedy television film,  Roald Dahl's Esio Trot. It features Dustin Hoffman, as Mr Hoppy and Judi Dench as Mrs Silver, with James Corden as the narrator. Filming took place in May 2014 in London. It was screened on 1 January 2015 and received praise, with The Guardian calling it "a thing of wonder".

References

Editions
  (hardcover, 1990)
  (paperback, 1991)
 

1990 British novels
1990 children's books
British children's books
British children's novels
British novels adapted into films
Books about turtles
Children's books by Roald Dahl
Jonathan Cape books